Eumenides may refer to:

 Erinyes, or Eumenides, Greek deities of vengeance
 The Eumenides, the third part of Aeschylus' Greek tragedy, the Oresteia